Seuli Saha is an Indian politician member of All India Trinamool Congress.  She is an MLA, elected from the Keshpur constituency in the 2016 West Bengal state assembly election. In 2021 assembly election she was re-elected from the same constituency.

References 

Trinamool Congress politicians from West Bengal
Living people
People from Paschim Medinipur district
West Bengal MLAs 2021–2026
Year of birth missing (living people)